The lemon dove or cinnamon dove (Columba larvata) is a species of bird in the pigeon family Columbidae found in montane forests of sub-Saharan Africa. The São Tomé lemon dove is usually treated as a subspecies. The lemon dove has a generally brownish-grey plumage with a cinnamon brown breast. Males have a greenish-glossed neck and white markings on the head, and females and juveniles are rather more brown and have grey facial markings. This dove is a common species, and the International Union for Conservation of Nature has rated its conservation status as being of "least concern".

Taxonomy
It differs from the other African pigeons of the genus Columba by its terrestrial habits and the white face and forehead of adult males; it is therefore sometimes separated in the genus Aplopelia. Some treat the Gulf of Guinea populations (São Tomé lemon-dove) as a separate species C. simplex (or A. simplex), others as subspecies of C. larvata. In the latter case, the species as a whole may be called simply lemon-dove, and if Aplopelia is considered a valid genus it would then be monotypic.

Description

Adult males have a plumage that is dark brown above, glossed green on sides of neck, and cinnamon brown below. As noted, they have conspicuous white face markings. The feet, iris and orbital skin are red, the bill is black. Females and young males are generally similar, with a lighter brown plumage and dull grey facial markings. The males of western African subspecies have a dark grey plumage.

Distribution
The lemon dove has a very wide range and is distributed in montane forests in sub-Saharan Africa, ranging for example from some  ASL in eastern Africa. The diet consists mainly of various small fruits, seeds, molluscs and insects. The female usually lays two creamy white eggs.

Status
Widespread throughout its range, the population trend of the lemon dove is stable and the bird is evaluated as a species of least concern on the IUCN Red List of Threatened Species. Nonetheless, it seems to be declining in certain parts of its range; in Tanzania for example it is not rare above  ASL in the Nguu North Forest Reserve, but not at all common in some lower-lying habitat. It is nearly absent from the southeast of that country.

References

Sources 
 Jensen, Flemming P.; Tøttrup, Anders P. & Christensen, Kim D. (2005): The avifauna of coastal forests in southeast Tanzania. Scopus 25: 1-22. PDF fulltext
 Seddon, N.; Ekstrom, J.M.M.; Capper, D.R.; Isherwood, I.S.; Muna, R.; Pople, R.G.; Tarimo & Timothy, E.J. (1999): The importance of the Nilo and Nguu North Forest Reserves for the conservation of montane forest birds in Tanzania. Biological Conservation 87(1): 59–72.  PDF fulltext
 Sinclair, Ian; Hockey, Phil & Tarboton, Warwick R. (2002): SASOL Birds of Southern Africa. Struik, Cape Town

External links 
 BirdLife Species Factsheet
 (Cinnamon dove = ) lemon dove - Species text in The Atlas of Southern African Birds

lemon dove
Birds of Sub-Saharan Africa
Birds of the Gulf of Guinea
lemon dove
Taxobox binomials not recognized by IUCN